Wroughton is a village in Wiltshire, England.

Wroughton may also refer to:

Philip Wroughton (1846–1910), English landowner and politician
Philip Lavallin Wroughton (1933–2020), Lord Lieutenant of Berkshire, England
Richard Wroughton (1748–1822), British actor
Robert Charles Wroughton (1849–1921), naturalist, British India
William Wroughton (c.1509–1559), English politician